Eddie Costa, Mat Mathews & Don Elliott at Newport is a live album featuring performances by Eddie Costa's Trio/Quintet, Mat Mathews' Quartet and Don Elliott's Quartet recorded at the Newport Jazz Festival in 1957 and released on the Verve label.

Track listing
 "Taking a Chance on Love" (Vernon Duke, John La Touche, Ted Fetter)
 "There'll Never Be Another You" (Harry Warren, Mack Gordon) 
 "I'll Remember April" (Gene de Paul, Patricia Johnston, Don Raye)
 "I Never Knew" (Ted Fio Rito, Gus Kahn) 
 "Flamingo" (Ted Grouya, Edmund Anderson)
 "Windmill Blues" (Mat Mathews)
 "Dancing in the Dark" (Howard Dietz, Arthur Schwartz)
 "I Love You" (Cole Porter)
 "'S Wonderful" (George Gershwin, Ira Gershwin) 
Recorded at the Newport Jazz Festival, Newport, RI on July 5, 1957 (tracks 4-6) and July 6, 1957 (tracks 1-3 & 7-9)

Personnel

Tracks 1-3
Eddie Costa - piano
Rolf Kühn - clarinet (tracks 2 & 3) 
Dick Johnson - alto saxophone (tracks 2 & 3)
Ernie Furtado – bass
Al Beldini - drums

Tracks 4-6
Mat Mathews - accordion
Hank Jones - piano
Ernie Furtado - bass
Johnny Cresci - drums

Tracks 7-9
Don Elliott - mellophone, vibraphone, bongos
Bill Evans - piano
Ernie Furtado - bass
Al Beldini - drums

References

Verve Records live albums
Eddie Costa albums
Don Elliott albums
Albums recorded at the Newport Jazz Festival
1957 live albums
Albums produced by Norman Granz